is a Japanese singer, producer, composer, lyricist, arranger and artist. She is broadly active, from pop music to experimental music and art. Her output has also included drawing, installation art, media art, poetry and other literature, and recitation. She also produces numerous projects and for artists, including her band, Sōtaisei Riron. Along with appearing in the Oricon charts with several hit songs, she has also created a project that involved the use of satellite, biological data and biotechnology, a song-generating robot powered by artificial intelligence and her own voice, an independently-developed VR system, and original electronic musical instruments. Major recent activities include exhibitions at Mori Art Museum, Toyota Municipal Museum of Art, KENPOKU ART 2016, and Yamaguchi Center for Arts and Media [YCAM]. Her Tensei Jingle and Flying Tentacles albums, both released in 2016, received praise from figures including Ryuichi Sakamoto, Jeff Mills, Fennesz, Penguin Cafe, Kiyoshi Kurosawa and Toh EnJoe. She is known for her solo works including theme songs in several anime series, such as The Tatami Galaxy, Arakawa Under The Bridge, Space Dandy, Sailor Moon Crystal, Hi Score Girl, Eureka Seven and Mawaru Penguindrum. As well as being the lead vocal of the rock band Sōtaisei Riron, she also works as a contemporary artist, illustrator and narrator. She also goes by the alias of  when credited for lyrics and composing. In 2017 she won the STARTS Prize for Artistic Exploration for converting her pop song I’m Humanity into DNA.

Discography

Studio albums 
 Blu-Day (2010) (as Etsuko Yakushimaru & D.V.D)
 Radio Onsen Eutopia (2013)
 Flying Tentacles (2016) (as Yakushimaru Experiment)

Singles 
2009
 Oyasumi Paradox
 Jenny wa Gokigen Naname

2010
 Venus to Jesus
 Kamisama no Iutōri (as Junji Ishiwatari, Yoshinori Sunahara & Etsuko Yakushimaru)
 Cosmos vs Alien

2011
 Adaptation 05.1 - eyrs ~ Adaptation 05.2 Ballet Mécanique - eyrs (as Ryuichi Sakamoto & Etsuko Yakushimaru)
 Lulu/Tokimeki Hacker
 Nornir/Shōnen yo Ware ni Kaere (as Etsuko Yakushimaru Metro Orchestra)

2012
 Kiri Kiri Mai
 Yami Yami
 Lonely Planet

2013
 Shōnen yo Ware ni Kaere (Radio Onsen Eutopia version)

2014
 Welcome to the X Dimension (X次元へようこそ X Jigen e Yōkoso)/Absolute Monsieur
 Chia・Chia (チア・チア)

2016
New moon ni Koishite/eternal eternity (opening and ending for Sailor Moon Crystal Season 3)
 New moon ni Koishite/Zjo sensou (OST for Sailor Moon Crystal Season 3)
 I'm Humanity (Watashi wa Jinrui)

2017
 Flash of Dopamine
Hige The Cat

2018

AfterSchoolDi(e)stra(u)ction
Songs of Atarima Etsuko
Ballet Mécanique (as Etsuko Yakushimaru & Yoshinori Sunahara )

References

External links 
 

Japanese women singers
Living people
Year of birth missing (living people)